Blakea granatensis is a species of plant in the family Melastomataceae. It is endemic to Colombia.

References

granatensis
Endemic flora of Colombia
Critically endangered plants
Taxonomy articles created by Polbot